Catherine Flemming (born 2 February 1967 in Karl-Marx-Stadt, East Germany) is a German film and TV actress. She has performed in more than eighty films and TV roles since 1995, nearly all in German.

She is best known in English for her role in the 2016 British TV series Victoria, where she portrays the Duchess of Kent, the mother of Queen Victoria.

Partial filmography

Television appearances

References

External links
 
 

1967 births
Living people
German film actresses
Actresses from Berlin
German television actresses
20th-century German actresses
21st-century German actresses